Cristina Fernández Cubas (Arenys de Mar, Barcelona province, 1945) is a Spanish writer and journalist. She has been described as "one of the most important writers who have begun to publish since the end of the Franco dictatorship"  and has been credited with inaugurating "a renaissance in the short story genre in Spain."

Biography and literary career 
Fernández Cubas studied Law and Journalism at the University of Barcelona, where she met the writer Carlos Trías Sagnier, whom she later married..  They have travelled extensively, and lived in many different cities, including Cairo, Lima, Buenos Aires, Paris and Berlin.

Fernández Cubas practised journalism from an early age and published her first collection of short stories, Mi hermana Elba, in 1980. This was followed by Los altillos de Brumal (1983), El ángulo del horror (1990), Con Ágatha en Estambul (1994), and Parientes pobres del diablo (2006), which won the Setenil Award in the same year. In 2009, her anthology Todos los cuentos was awarded several prizes, including the Premio Ciudad de Barcelona, the Premio Salambó, the Premio Qwerty and the Premio Tormenta.

She has written several novels. El año de Gracia (1985), principally set on the Scottish island of Gruinard, is an example of modern Spanish literature at its finest, with all the characteristics of a modern classic. It is partly based on a true story reported in El País, around which the author weaves a narrative which takes the reader into the realms of the fantastic. It’s a great adventure story and at the same time a voyage of personal discovery, a rite of passage. El columpio (1995) is the story of a girl's re-encounter with her three estranged uncles who share a house in a remote corner of the Pyrenees. In 2013 she published the novel La puerta entreabierta under the pseudonym Fernanda Kubbs, in which a sceptical journalist undergoes an unexpected transformation when she visits a clairvoyant.

She has also written a play, Hermanas de sangre (1998), a book of memoirs, Cosas que ya no existen (2001), which, much to her delight, won the Premio NH Hoteles for short stories in 2001, and an outstanding biography of Emilia Pardo Bazán (2001).

In 2016, Fernández Cubas was awarded the National Literature Prize for Narrative and the Premio de la Crítica Española for her collection of short stories La habitación de Nona (2015), translated into English as Nona’s Room. In his review in the New York Times, the critic Terrence Rafferty comments: "In these six elegant stories she’s most interested in the ambiguities and periodic disturbances that plague the imagination, and reports on them with the appropriate sense of awe, even of dread. In the territory of the imagination, the threat of madness is never too far away, a dark cloud hovering." Another critic, Lucy Scholes, has commented that the author "brings darkness to light with uncanny flair", also warning that these, "off-kilter Gothic short stories are remarkable but not for the faint-hearted". More recently, her stories have been praised for their surrealism by literary critic Rachel Rees. 

In the words of the academic Phyllis Zatlin, "her stories tend to explore the mysteries of both external reality and of the human psyche. Most of them, including some that fall outside the fantastic mode, explore inner worlds of fantasy and unconscious desires".

In December 2021, Cristina was awarded an honorary doctorate by the University of Alcalá de Henares.

Bibliography

Short stories 
 Mi hermana Elba (My Sister Elba), Tusquets Editores, 1980
 Los altillos de Brumal (The Attics of Brumal), Tusquets Editores, 1983
 El ángulo del horror (The Angle of Horror), Tusquets Editores, 1990
 Con Ágatha en Estambul (With Agatha in Istanbul), Tusquets Editores, 1994
 Parientes pobres del diablo (Poor Relations to the Devil), Tusquets Editores 2006
 Todos los cuentos (All the Short Stories), Tusquets Editores, 2008
 La habitación de Nona (Nona’s Room), Tusquets Editores, 2015

Novels 
 El año de Gracia (The Gap Year), Tusquets Editores, 1985 
 El columpio (The Swing), novel, Tusquets Editores,1995
 La puerta entreabierta (The Half-Open Door), [by "Fernanda Kubbs"] Tusquets Editores, 2013

Other 
 Cris y Cros (Criss-Cross) & El vendedor de sombras (The Seller of Shadows), Alfaguara, 1988
 Hermanas de sangre (Blood Sisters), play, Tusquets Editores, 1998
 Emilia Pardo Bazán, biography, Editorial Omega, 2001
 Cosas que ya no existen (Things Which No Longer Exist), memoirs, Lumen 2001, Tusquets Editores 2011
 De mayor quiero ser bruja (When I Grow Up I Want to be a Witch), children's story, illustrated by Luisa Vera, Malpaso Ediciones, 2017

Translations into English 
 
 Blood Sisters (Hermanas de sangre) translated by Karen Denise Dinicola, Estreno Press, 2003,  
 Nona’s Room (La habitación de Nona) translated by Kathryn Phillips-Miles and Simon Deefholts, Peter Owen Publishers, 2017, 
 The Penguin Book of Spanish Short Stories, edited by Margaret Jull Costa, includes A Fresh Start (La nueva vida) translated by Kathryn Phillips-Miles & Simon Deefholts, Penguin Books, 2021, 
 Take Six: Six Spanish Women Writers, edited and translated by Kathryn Phillips-Miles and Simon Deefholts: Dedalus Books, 2022. (Contains new translations of stories by Cristina).
 The Gap Year (El año de Gracia) translated by Kathryn Phillips-Miles and Simon Deefholts, The Clapton Press, 2022.

References

External links 
 https://www.peterowen.com/cristina-fernandez-cubas-why-i-write/
 http://www.lofantastico.com/proyectos-de-investigacioacuten.html

University of Barcelona alumni
20th-century Spanish women writers
20th-century Spanish writers
Spanish women journalists
Women writers from Catalonia
Journalists from Catalonia
1945 births
Living people